Gigantopecten latissimus is a species of fossil scallop, a marine bivalve mollusk in the  family Pectinidae, the scallops. This species lived during the Miocene and the Pliocene. Fossils have been found in the sediments of France and Spain.

Description
This shell is thick and biconvex. The left valve is slightly more convex than the right one. The outer surface of the right valve has six  shallow radial ribs that are rectangular in cross-section, while the left valve shows five radial ribs on the external surface. Both valves have distinct concentric growth striae.

References

Pectinidae
Bivalves described in 1814